Maria Brizzi Giorgi (7 August 1775 – 7 January 1812 in Bologna) was an Italian organist, composer and pianist noted for her improvisational ability.

Biography
She was born in Bologna into a musical family and began to perform in public at an early age. She served as organist and choral director from 1787–89 with the Sisters of St. Bartholomew in Ancona and then returned to Bologna where she continued her studies in music.

Brizzi married Luigi Giorgi in 1793 and opened a salon, continuing to perform as a pianist in Europe. She was admired as a performer, and Haydn, Muzio Clementi and Leopold Kozeluch dedicated works to her. A military march composed by Brizzi was performed for Napoleon when he passed through Bologna in 1807. She taught music and was member of the Accademia Filarmonica di Bologna. She died in Bologna after childbirth at the age of 36.

References

1775 births
1812 deaths
18th-century Italian composers
18th-century Italian women
18th-century keyboardists
18th-century women composers
19th-century women composers
Italian Classical-period composers
Deaths in childbirth
Italian classical organists
Italian women classical composers
Italian music educators
Italian salon-holders
Organ improvisers
Women organists